29 (twenty-nine) is the natural number following 28 and preceding 30.

Mathematics
 29 is the tenth prime number, and the fourth primorial prime.
 29 forms a twin prime pair with thirty-one, which is also a primorial prime. Twenty-nine is also the sixth Sophie Germain prime.
 29 is the sum of three consecutive squares, 22 + 32 + 42.
 29 is a Lucas prime, a Pell prime, and a tetranacci number.
 29 is an Eisenstein prime with no imaginary part and real part of the form 3n − 1.  29 is also the 10th supersingular prime.
 None of the first 29 natural numbers have more than two different prime factors. This is the longest such consecutive sequence.
 29 is a Markov number, appearing in the solutions to x + y + z = 3xyz: {2, 5, 29}, {2, 29, 169}, {5, 29, 433}, {29, 169, 14701}, etc.
 29 is a Perrin number, preceded in the sequence by 12, 17, 22.
 29 is the smallest positive whole number that cannot be made from the numbers {1, 2, 3, 4}, using each exactly once and using only addition, subtraction, multiplication, and division.
 29 is the number of pentacubes if reflections are considered distinct.

The 29th dimension is the highest dimension for compact hyperbolic Coxeter polytopes that are bounded by a fundamental polyhedron, and the highest dimension that holds arithmetic discrete groups of reflections with noncompact unbounded fundamental polyhedra.

Religion
 The Bishnois community follows 29 principles. Guru Jambheshwar had laid down 29 principles to be followed by the sect in 1485 A.D. In Hindi, Bish means 20 and noi means 9; thus, Bishnoi translates as Twenty-niners.
 The number of suras in the Qur'an that begin with muqatta'at.

Science and astronomy
 The atomic number of copper.
 Messier object M29, a magnitude 6.6 open cluster in the constellation Cygnus.
 The New General Catalogue object NGC 29, a spiral galaxy in the constellation Andromeda.

 The lunar month is very close to twenty-nine days.
 Saturn requires over 29 years to orbit the Sun.
 The number of days February has in leap years.

Language and literature
 The number of letters in the Turkish, Finnish, Swedish, Danish and Norwegian alphabets
 The number of Knuts in one Sickle in the fictional currency in the Harry Potter novels

Geography
 In the name of the town Twentynine Palms, California
 The number of the French department of Finistère

Military
 29th Regiment of Foot, a former regiment in the British Army
 Marine Corps Air Ground Combat Center Twentynine Palms, affectionately referred to by Marines as "Twentynine Stumps".
 Boeing B-29, a large bomber

Music and entertainment
 "$29.00" is a song on the album Blue Valentine by Tom Waits.
 29, an album by Ryan Adams.
 "No. 29", a song about a washed-up high school football star from the album Exit 0 by Steve Earle.
 The track from which the Chattanooga Choo Choo train departs in the Glenn Miller song.
 The number of attributes existing according to The Strokes in "You Only Live Once".
 A track from Bon Iver's album, 22, A Million, all tracks being numerically themed.
 A 2022 song by American singer-songwriter Demi Lovato.

Sport
 The 29er sailing skiff is a high-performance two-handed yacht.
 A 29er is a mountain bike with 29-inch wheels.
 29 is the highest possible score in a hand of Cribbage or Khanhoo.
 The Atlanta Braves set the National League record for most runs scored in a game as they scored 29 times against the Miami Marlins on September 9, 2020.

History
 The Twenty-nine is often used in New Zealand for the missing miners and contractors believed to have been killed in the Pike River Mine disaster in November 2010.

See also 
 List of highways numbered 29

References

External links

 Prime Curios! 29 from the Prime Pages

Integers